Walter Daniel Erviti Roldán (born 12 June 1980) is an Argentine football manager and former player who played mainly as a deep-lying playmaker.

Career

Club career
Erviti began his playing career in 1998 with San Lorenzo de Almagro, where he was part of the squad that won the Clausura 2001 championship.

In 2002, he joined Mexican side Monterrey. In 2003, he won his second league championship when Monterrey won the Clausura 2003 championship.

In 2008 Erviti returned to Argentina to play for Banfield, and was a key player in squad that won the Argentine championship for the first time in the history of the club, featuring in every game of the Apertura 2009 championship season.

On January 31, 2011, Erviti left Banfield and signed a three-year contract with Boca Juniors, that paid US$3.2 million for his transfer.

In June 2013 he joined Mexican side Atlante F.C.

International career
Erviti made his international debut for the Argentina national team on 26 January 2010 at the age of 29 in a 3–2 win in a friendly match against Costa Rica.

Coaching career
On 28 January 2021, Erviti was appointed manager of Atlanta, in what would be his first experience as a coach. After a bad start to the 2022 season, Erviti agreed to step down from the position on 1 May 2022.

Honours

Club 
San Lorenzo
Argentine Primera División: 1
 2001 Clausura
Copa Mercosur: 1
 2001
Monterrey
Mexican Primera División: 1
 2003 Clausura
Banfield
Argentine Primera División: 1
 2009 Apertura
Boca Juniors
Argentine Primera División: 1
 2011 Apertura
Copa Argentina: 1
 2012

References

External links

 Argentine Primera statistics at Fútbol XXI  
 Statistics at Guardian Stats Centre
 Erviti, Walter Daniel at Historia de Boca.com 
 
 

1980 births
Living people
Sportspeople from Mar del Plata
Argentine footballers
Argentina international footballers
Argentine expatriate footballers
Association football midfielders
Argentine Primera División players
Liga MX players
San Lorenzo de Almagro footballers
C.F. Monterrey players
Club Atlético Banfield footballers
Boca Juniors footballers
Atlante F.C. footballers
Club Atlético Independiente footballers
Argentine expatriate sportspeople in Mexico
Expatriate footballers in Mexico
Argentine football managers
Club Atlético Atlanta managers